Tara Concepta D'Souza (born 20 December 1986), commonly known as Tara D'Souza, is an Indian actress and model, known for her work in the films Mujhse Fraaandship Karoge and Mere Brother Ki Dulhan.

Early life and background
D'Souza was born in Hyderabad, Telangana, India to Konkani parents Andreas and Diane D'Souza. She also has one brother, Noel Prasad D'Souza and one sister, Mira D'Souza.  She attended Vidyaranya High School for Boys and Girls, a school which is partly based on the teachings of Jiddu Krishnamurti.

Career

Modeling
While in college, D'Souza pursued a career in modeling and was a former Kingfisher Calendar girl, chosen after 2010 reality TV series, Kingfisher Calendar Model Hunt on NDTV Good Times.

Acting
In 2005, D'Souza made her cinematic debut in The Angrez (2005) which was a Tollywood film which only released in some parts of Hyderabad and did become a super hit film locally, and since it didn't release in many theaters she was not well known after this picture.
She was cast in Yash Raj Films Mere Brother Ki Dulhan opposite Ali Zafar; it was considered as a hit. Fans enjoyed her performance in this film and she became very well known.  She also acted in Mujhse Fraaandship Karoge, a story based on Facebook, which received positive reviews.

Filmography

Television

 Daanav Hunters (2015)
 Zero KMS (2018)

See also

 List of Indian film actresses

References

External links

 
 
 

Living people
1986 births
Actresses from Hyderabad, India
Female models from Hyderabad, India
Indian film actresses
Actresses in Hindi cinema
Actresses in Urdu cinema
21st-century Indian actresses